A law dictionary (also known as legal dictionary) is a dictionary that is designed and compiled to give information about terms used in the field of law.

Types
Distinctions are made among various types of law dictionaries.

Differentiating factors include: 
 Number of languages covered: a monolingual law dictionary covers one language, a bilingual covers two.
 Number of fields covered: a single-field dictionary covers an entire field of law, whereas a sub-field dictionary covers a part of a field of law, e.g. a dictionary of contract law.

Quality
A good bilingual or multilingual law dictionary needs to take the users' expected languages and professional competences into account. The lexicographers therefore must consider the following aspects: dictionary user research, dictionary typology, structure, and presentation of relevant information. When making a law dictionary, the lexicographers attempt to present the information in such a way that the user is not burdened with excessive lexicographic information costs.

Functions
As pointed out by Sandro Nielsen in 1994, law dictionaries can serve various functions. The traditional law dictionary with definitions of legal terms serves to help users understand the legal texts they read (a communicative function) or to acquire knowledge about legal matters independent of any text (a cognitive function) – such law dictionaries are usually monolingual. Bilingual law dictionaries may also serve a variety of functions. First, they may have entry words in one language and definitions in another language – these dictionaries give help to understand legal texts, usually written in a foreign language, and to acquire knowledge, usually about a foreign legal system. Second, bilingual law dictionaries with entry words in one language and equivalents in another language provide help to translate legal texts, into or from a foreign language, and sometimes also to produce legal texts, usually in a foreign language.

Formats
With the advance of technology, the legal dictionary has made its way onto the Internet and smartphones. Law students and litigants can now look up the meaning of legal terms in seconds.

Legal terminology textbook
Unlike a law dictionary, which arranges and defines legal words and phrases individually and in alphabetical order, a legal terminology textbook arranges and defines legal words and phrases in groups and by topic. As a result, a student or other person interested in understanding an array of related legal words and phrases may prefer to use a legal terminology textbook instead.

See also
 Black's Law Dictionary
 Bouvier's Law Dictionary
 Encyclopedia
 Law Library Resource Xchange
 List of legal abbreviations
 Legal treatise
 Natural law
 Wex

References

External links

Legal research
Legal bibliographies